Orosháza is a district in south-western part of Békés County. Orosháza is also the name of the town where the district seat is found. The district is located in the Southern Great Plain Statistical Region.

Geography 
Orosháza District is bordered by Szarvas District to the north, Békéscsaba District and Mezőkovácsháza District to the east, Makó District (Csongrád County) to the south, Hódmezővásárhely District and Szentes District (Csongrád County) to the west. There are eight inhabited places in Orosháza District.

Municipalities 
The district has two towns, two large villages and four villages.
(ordered by population, as of 1 January 2012)

The bolded municipalities are cities, italics municipalities are large villages.

Demographics

Ethnicity
Besides the Hungarian majority, the main minorities are the Slovak (approx. 1,500), Roma (650), German (250) and Romanian (150).

Total population (2011 census): 51,482
Ethnic groups (2011 census): Identified themselves: 45,712 persons:
Hungarians: 42,825 (93.68%)
Slovaks: 1,460 (3.19%)
Gypsies: 645 (1.41%)
Others and indefinable: 782 (1.71%)
Approx. 6,000 persons in Orosháza District did not declare their ethnic group at the 2011 census.

Religion
Religious adherence in the county according to 2011 census:

Catholic – 10,548 (Roman Catholic – 10,469; Greek Catholic – 77)
Evangelical – 6,958
Reformed – 2,329
other religions – 920
Non-religious – 16,045
Atheism – 654
Undeclared – 14,028

Gallery

See also
List of cities and towns of Hungary

References

External links
 Postal codes of the Orosháza District

Districts in Békés County